Sir John Throckmorton (by 152422 May 1580) was a lawyer and member of the English Parliament during the reign of Queen Mary I. He was also a witness to Queen Mary's will.

Biography
He was the seventh son of Sir George Throckmorton (d. 1552) of Coughton Court in Warwickshire and trained in the law becoming an Inner Temple barrister. His mother, Hon. Katherine Vaux was the half-sister of Sir Thomas Parr, making John a cousin to Queen Catherine Parr.

He married Margaret, the sister of George Puttenham, the reputed author of 'The Arte of English Poesie'. She had links with the influential Grey family of Leicestershire.

Sir John was MP for Leicester (1545), Camelford (1547), Warwick (Mar 1553), Old Sarum (Oct 1553) and then four times for Coventry (1554, 1555, 1558 and 1559). He was, in 1547, the first High Steward of the Royal Town of Sutton Coldfield appointed after the 1528 Royal Charter; and with the help of his patron, the Duke of Northumberland, he became attorney to the Council in the Marches of Wales in 1550. He later held various legal positions including Recorder of Coventry, Worcester, Ludlow, and Shrewsbury. During the reign of Queen Mary I (1553–1558) he was one of the two Masters of Requests. He was knighted in 1565 but later fell out of favour. His career ended in disgrace after he was found guilty of giving a judgement in favour of a relative.

He is remembered more for his connections than his own achievements:
His brother Sir Nicholas Throckmorton (1515–1571) was involved with the Wyatt Rebellion of 1554. His eldest brother was Sir Robert Throckmorton (1513–1581) of Coughton.
A relative John Throckmorton of Tortworth, Gloucestershire, MP for Wootton Bassett was executed for involvement in the Dudley conspiracy of 1555.
Son, Francis Throckmorton, was executed for treason for his part in the Throckmorton Plot of 1584.

References
History of Parliament, a biographical dictionary of Members of the House of Commons.
THROCKMORTON, John I (by 1524-80) of Feckenham, Worcs.

1520s births
1580 deaths
English knights
Knights Bachelor
Members of the Inner Temple
People from Warwickshire
John
English MPs 1545–1547
English MPs 1547–1552
English MPs 1553 (Edward VI)
English MPs 1553 (Mary I)
English MPs 1554–1555
English MPs 1555
English MPs 1558
English MPs 1559
Members of the pre-1707 English Parliament for constituencies in Cornwall
Members of the Parliament of England for Coventry